Lisa Holm, a 17-year-old girl from Skövde working in Blomberg in Götene Municipality, Sweden, disappeared on 7 June 2015 and her body was found days later in a workshed. Her disappearance, the search for her, and the trial and conviction of Nerijus Bilevicius for her murder received widespread media attention in Sweden and Scandinavia.

Murder
On 7 June 2015, Lisa Helena Holm (born 7 February 1998) was about to end her shift at a cafe where she had been working for the summer in Blomberg, close to Källby in Västergötland. She sent a text message at 18:23 to her father in Skövde, saying that she was on her way home on her moped. When Holm did not show up, her father drove to her workplace, hoping she was still there. When he found her moped with keys still in the ignition at the cafe, he and the cafe owner searched the cafe and nearby area without finding anything. At 21:47 they called the police and reported Holm missing. The police soon arrived and started dog searches in the area, in a barn there with several rooms, but found nothing. A glove was later found there.

Discovery of body
On Tuesday 9 June, the search team found Holm's cellphone case, receipts, tickets and similar items, all of which was identified as belonging to Holm. On Wednesday 10 June, the search area was extended, and the Swedish version of the organization Missing People was called in to help with the search. That day, a pair of earrings was found in the barn. Her license card for her moped and keys to her home were also found that day. On Friday 12 June, Missing People searched the Martorp estate a few kilometres from the cafe. Two people arrived there by car, claiming that the area already had been searched. Missing People representatives became suspicious and called police. They continued to search the area and found a jacket and a helmet belonging to Holm. Later that same night, Holm's body was found in a workshed nearby.

Trial
The county court concluded that Holm had been murdered by hanging or strangulation. Technical evidence showed that DNA from Lithuanian citizen Nerijus Bilevicius (born 3 March 1980) was on pieces of rope and ten pieces of Holm's clothing, both inside and out, as well as all over the crime scene. Police and the court also found that Bilevicius had no alibi for the day of the murder. The motive was of a sexual nature. In his computer police found pornography, and technical findings showed that he had been very active sexually in the shed. His actions at Martorp when Missing People first showed up also indicated that he did not want police to continue searching that particular area.

The circumstances were considered especially heinous by investigators as Holm was only seventeen years old and physically weaker than Bilevicius. He showed great ruthlessness and criminal intent and police stated that Holm had suffered before finally being murdered at the scene. Bilevicius was sentenced to life imprisonment on 17 November 2015.

His attorney Björn Hurtig filed at the court of appeals on 15 April 2016. Hurtig's reasons to appeal his client's sentence were given as someone else having helped or committed the murder and removed the body of Holm, such as the convict's wife. On 2 May 2016, the court of appeals declined to grant a new review or trial, and his life sentence became final.

Conviction and aftermath
On 4 July 2016, it was announced that Bilevicius would be placed at Norrtälje Prison, a high-security facility. He was transferred to Lithuania in early 2017, and later that year won an appeal and got 15 years, but by an appellate court in Siauliai in late 2017 his sentence was again set at life imprisonment.

Bilevičius' death
On 3 August 2022 around 6 p.m. local time, another life imprisonment inmate stabbed Bilevičius in the neck with an improvised knife while on a walk in Marijampolė Correction House. Bilevičius died while being transported to a hospital.

See also
List of solved missing person cases

References

2010s missing person cases
2015 murders in Sweden
Formerly missing people
Incidents of violence against women
Missing person cases in Sweden
Rape in Sweden
Scandals in Sweden
Västergötland
Femicide in Sweden